Willie Wiredhand is the cartoon mascot of the National Rural Electric Cooperative Association, created in 1950 and still in use by co-op electricity companies. His head is a lightbulb socket, his body is a wire, and his hips and legs are a two-pronged power plug. Willie was created as a rival for the corporate Reddy Kilowatt, which led to a lawsuit in 1956 alleging trademark infringement; the case was resolved in Willie Wiredhand's favor and Willie was granted his own trademark in 1957.

Creation
When electricity was first widely installed across the United States, private investor-owned utilities did not consider it sufficiently profitable to build electric infrastructure in rural areas. In 1936, the Rural Electrification Act provided federal loans for rural co-ops to build non-profit electric infrastructure through democratically-elected organizations. This program was part of Franklin D. Roosevelt's "New Deal", and continues as the Rural Utilities Service in the United States Department of Agriculture. The National Rural Electric Cooperative Association (NRECA) was founded in 1942 as a trade organization to represent these rural co-ops and provide additional services which were too expensive individually. Meanwhile, Ashton B. Collins Sr. had been licensing his Reddy Kilowatt electrical mascot to investor-owned utilities since 1934. In 1948, Collins refused to license the Reddy Kilowatt character to rural electrical co-ops, on the grounds that it would harm the reputation of the investor-owned utilities to be associated with the federally-subsidized rural programs. This sparked the NRECA's creation of their own mascot, Willie Wiredhand.

The mascot contest was announced in Rural Electrification Magazine in December 1948, with a $50 prize for the best design. The freelance artist Andrew “Drew” McLay designed "Willie the Wired Hand," with the "birthday" of October 30, 1950. The name is a play on the phrase "hired hand," a common term for agricultural laborers. This character, with the slightly revised name "Willie Wiredhand," was chosen as the contest winner in 1951. He advertised electricity as "the never-tiring, always available hired hand to help the nation’s farmers."

Lawsuit
Collins challenged NRCEA's right to its own mascot from the announcement of the contest, writing that Collins was "the originator and owner of figures symbolizing the use of electric energy". The first lawsuit was filed in 1953 in South Carolina’s federal district court. This case was decided in the co-ops' favor in 1956, and Collins appealed to the U.S. Court of Appeals Fourth Circuit. The three judges unanimously ruled that the lower court's decision held, dismissing the complaint on January 7, 1957. The opinion, written by Judge Harry E. Watkins, stated that "[t]he names Reddy Kilowatt and Willie Wiredhand are entirely different. The two figures themselves do not look alike." Willie Wiredhand was granted his own trademark by the U.S. Patent Office in 1957.

Appearances and uses
A political campaign, "Minutemen for Rural Electrification," included an image of Willie dressed as a Minuteman, which appeared on stage behind then-Senator John F. Kennedy at a 1959 NRECA event in Washington, D.C.

Two comic books were published in 1967 and 1968, "Cousin Johnny Discovers Power in Rural America" and its sequel "It’s Annual Meeting Time for the Davis Family," which starred Willie explaining rural co-op electrification.

References

Advertising characters
Male characters in advertising
Electric power in the United States
Mascots introduced in 1950